West Franklin may refer to:

West Franklin, Indiana
West Franklin Township, Armstrong County, Pennsylvania